Edna Bertha Pearce (26 March 1906 – 23 May 1995) was a New Zealand kindergarten teacher and director, policewoman, and internment camp supervisor. She was born in Christchurch, New Zealand, in 1906. She made New Zealand's first arrest by a policewoman, and when she was transferred to Hamilton in 1966 she was the city's only female police officer.

References

1906 births
1995 deaths
New Zealand educators
New Zealand police officers
Women police officers